Suárez Glacier also known as Petzval Glacier is a glacier flowing into the small cove between Skontorp Cove and Sturm Cove on the west coast of Graham Land. It was first mapped by Scottish geologist David Ferguson in 1913–14. The 5th Chilean Antarctic Expedition (1950–51) remapped it and named it for Lieutenant Commander Francisco Suárez V., Operations Officer on the transport ship Angamos.

References

Glaciers of Danco Coast